Stanislav Antonov (born 21 March 1986) is a Bulgarian footballer who plays as a goalkeeper for Spartak Pleven.

References

External links

1986 births
Living people
Bulgarian footballers
First Professional Football League (Bulgaria) players
PFC Spartak Pleven players
FC Dunav Ruse players
Association football goalkeepers
Sportspeople from Pleven